Guy Harley Oseary (born October 3, 1972) is an Israeli-American talent manager and writer. His clients include Madonna and the Red Hot Chili Peppers.

Biography 
Guy Oseary was born on October 3, 1972, in Jerusalem, to a Jewish family. He was raised in California and attended Beverly Hills High School. Together since 2006, he married Brazilian model Michelle Alves on October 24, 2017. They have four children together.

Career 
Oseary began as an independent A&R rep in 1989 at the age of 17, he soon became one of the first employees of Madonna's Maverick record label in 1992.

At the age of 19, Oseary joined Maverick Records as an A&R executive, and then rose through the ranks to chairman, developing a roster of artists that included The Prodigy, Alanis Morissette, Deftones, The Wreckers, Paul Oakenfold, Michelle Branch, Summercamp, and soundtracks on such film series as Austin Powers, The Matrix, and Kill Bill. Oseary guided Maverick to sell over 100 million albums worldwide and secured its spot as one of the industry's leading boutique labels.

As part of Maverick Films, Oseary executive produced Rob Zombie's first two ventures into feature filmmaking: House of 1000 Corpses and The Devil's Rejects; and four films of The Twilight Saga: Twilight, New Moon, Eclipse, Breaking Dawn – Part 1. He also served as executive producer on NBC's Last Call with Carson Daly and New Year's Eve with Carson Daly.

In May 2004, Oseary partnered with Jason Weinberg and Stephanie Simon to become a principal in Untitled Entertainment, a management company with offices in Beverly Hills and New York City. In 2005, Oseary became the manager for his longtime business partner Madonna and guided her through the Confessions Tour (2006), Sticky & Sweet Tour (2008–09), and The MDNA Tour (2012), which are among the highest-grossing concert tours of all time. He won Top Manager at the Billboard Touring Awards in 2006 and 2009. In 2007, Oseary negotiated a 360 deal partnering Madonna with Live Nation worth $120 million. On November 12, 2013, it was announced that Oseary would be replacing Paul McGuinness as manager of U2 in a $30 million deal which would see Live Nation buy both Maverick and U2's management company Principle Management. McGuinness was quoted as saying "I have long regarded Guy Oseary as the best manager of his generation, and there is no one else I would have considered to take over the day-to-day running of our business." Oseary is also the manager for comedian Amy Schumer and the rock band Red Hot Chili Peppers.

In March 2020, Oseary stepped down from his role at Maverick. In October 2020, Oseary co-founded Pearpop with Cole Mason.

In October 2021, Oseary signed Yuga Labs, the creators of the Bored Ape Yacht Club NFT project for representation.

Other work 

Oseary has written four books, including a book on Jewish influences in the music industry titled Jews Who Rock. His second book, On the Record, is a collection of first-hand accounts on how to break into the music industry from many of the most successful artists, producers, and executives. He also authored two coffee table books with his own photography of Madonna's 2006 and 2008–09 tours respectively titled "Madonna: Confessions" and "Madonna: Sticky & Sweet."

Oseary, along with Ashton Kutcher and Ronald Burkle, is a co-founder at A-Grade Investments, a venture capital firm that has made numerous investments in companies such as Airbnb, Foursquare, Shazam, SoundCloud, Spotify, and Uber. He co-founded Sound Ventures with Ashton Kutcher three years later to focus on sectors ranging from micro-mobility and insurance to fintech and medtech.

In 2010, Madonna and Oseary founded gym chain Hard Candy Fitness. They've also partnered with Iconix Brand Group to launch the lifestyle brand "Truth or Dare by Madonna."

Oseary appears in cameos in movies such as Charlie's Angels, Charlie's Angels: Full Throttle, and You Don't Mess with the Zohan. He also made a cameo in Madonna's 1992 music video for her single "Deeper and Deeper."

Charity 
In honor of his 46th birthday, Oseary launched Good Today (previously Good St.), a non-profit platform democratizing philanthropy and activism by making it easy and meaningful to give charity to hundreds of new causes and organizations across the globe.

References

Further reading 

 

1972 births
Living people
20th-century American businesspeople
21st-century American businesspeople
A&R people
American chief executives of financial services companies
American financiers
American investors
American music industry executives
American music managers
American writers about music
American talent agents
American venture capitalists
Beverly Hills High School alumni
Businesspeople from Los Angeles
Chief executives in the media industry
Film producers from California
Israeli chief executives
Israeli emigrants to the United States
Israeli film producers
Israeli financiers
Israeli investors
Israeli Jews
Israeli non-fiction writers
Jewish American writers
People from Jerusalem
Writers from Los Angeles
U2